In enzymology, a galactolipid O-acyltransferase is an enzyme that catalyzes the chemical reaction

2 mono-beta-D-galactosyldiacylglycerol  acylmono-beta-D-galactosyldiacylglycerol + mono-beta-D-galactosylacylglycerol

Hence, this enzyme has one substrate, mono-beta-D-galactosyldiacylglycerol, and two products, acylmono-beta-D-galactosyldiacylglycerol and mono-beta-D-galactosylacylglycerol.

This enzyme belongs to the family of transferases, specifically those acyltransferases transferring groups other than aminoacyl groups.  The systematic name of this enzyme class is mono-beta-D-galactosyldiacylglycerol:mono-beta-D-galactosyldiacylgly cerol acyltransferase. This enzyme is also called galactolipid:galactolipid acyltransferase.  This enzyme participates in glycerolipid metabolism.

References

 
 

EC 2.3.1
Enzymes of unknown structure